Yevstigney Ipat'yevich Fomin    (born St. Petersburg  – died St. Petersburg c ) was a Russian opera composer of Ukrainian origin of the 18th century.

Biography

Fomin was born in St. Petersburg into the family of a cannoneer, an artillery soldier of the Tobolsk infantry regiment. His father died when he was 6, and he passed into the care of his stepfather, I. Fedotov, a soldier. Fedotov took him to the Academy of Fine Arts in St. Petersburg on 21 April 1767, where Fomin studied architecture. As a full student there, he began learning the harpsichord in 1776 with Matteo Bumi. From 1777 he studied theory and composition with Hermann Raupach, and from 1779 with Blasius Sartori.

In 1782 he went to Bologna to study with Padre Martini and Stanislao Mattei; three years later he was accepted into the Accademia filarmonica. Returning to St. Petersburg in 1785, he taught at the theatrical school and composed operas. From 1797 he was répétiteur for the imperial theater under Paul I. He composed about 30 operas including Yamshchiki na podstave [The Coachmen at the Relay Station] (1787); Vecherinki [Soirées] (1788); Orfey i Evridika (1792), Amerikantsy [The Americans] (a comic opera) (1800), and Zolotoye yabloko [The Golden Apple] (performed after the composers death in 1803). The most successful for decades was his opera-melodrama Orfey i Evridika to a text by Yakov Knyazhnin. It was re-staged in Soviet times in 1947 in Moscow, and in 1953 and in 1961 in Leningrad.

The famous one-act opera Anyuta to a text by Mikhail Popov has been occasionally attributed to Fomin (which is not a certainty). In addition, Fomin has been credited with the music of another successful Russian opera Melnik – koldun, obmanshchik i svat (The miller who was a wizard, a cheat and a matchmaker, Moscow, 1779), on a subject resembling Rousseau’s Le devin du village: it is possible that this was his revision of the music compiled by a theatre violin player, Mikhail Sokolovsky.

Operas

The Novgorod Hero Boyeslayevich (Новгородский богатырь Боеслаевич – Novgorodskiy bogatyr’ Boyeslayevich, opera-ballet. Libretto by the Empress Catherine II, 12 December 1786 St Petersburg)
The Coachmen at the Relay Station (Ямщики на подставе - Yamshchiki na podstave 13 January 1787 St Petersburg)
Soirées (Вечеринки или гадай, гадай девица — Vecherinki, ili Gaday, gaday devitsa, 1788 St Petersburg)
Magician, Fortune-teller and Match-maker (Колдун, ворожея и сваха - Koldun, vorozheya i svakha, 1789 St Petersburg)
Orpheus and Eurydice (Орфей и Эвридика  — Orfey i Evridika, melodrama. Text by Yakov Knyazhnin, 13 January 1792 St Petersburg)
The Americans (Американцы - Amerikantsy, comic opera, 19 February 1800 St Petersburg)
Chloris and Milo (Клорида и Милон – Klorida i Milon, 18 November 1800 St Petersburg)
The Golden Apple (Золотое яблоко — Zolotoye yabloko, 27 April 1803 St Petersburg)

also:

Yaropolk and Oleg (Ярополк и Олег - Yaropolk i Oleg) - Choruses to a tragedy  by Vladislav Ozerov (1798)

Discography
Opera
 Orfey i Evridika (sung in Russian) European Festival Orchestra, conductor William Keitel, 20 July 2004, 1CD, Arte Nova Records
 Orfeo ed Euridice (sung in Russian). Performed by Maria Shorstova, Alexey Ivashchenko et al., The Horn Orchestra of Russia, Pratum Integrum Orchestra, cond. Pavel Serbin. Recorded in 2008. Moscow, Russia: Essential Music, ℗2009. Caro Mitis CM 0012008
 The Americans (sung in Russian) cond. Vladimir Andropov. USSR Bolshoi Theatre Chamber Orchestra (rec. 1988) C10 28271 009
 The Coachmen (Ямщики на подставе) cond. Vladimir Chernushenko. Leningrad State Conservatory Opera Orchestra (rec. 1982) C10 19625 009
 The Coachmen (Ямщики на подставе) cond. Nikolai Anosov. (rec.1947) tapes in All-Union Radio Archive. ~ first revival since premiere.

Orchestral, chamber and instrumental
The Golden Age - Moscow Concertino ensemble of soloists (CD)

Quotations

"Yevstigney Fomin, one of the most talented composers of his day and age and the founding father of Russian musical drama, also [like Vasily Pashkevich] died in poverty... His melodrama, based on the well-known legend about Orpheus and Eurydice, is a real masterpiece whose red-hot passions and tragic collisions have since been put to music with equal excellence. Orpheus premiered at Count Nikolai Sheremetev’s theatre in 1792 to the strains of a choir, orchestra and with a large cast of ballet dancers and actors. For more than two decades Orpheus ran thousands of times to invariable applause of local and visiting theatergoers. And still, the money Fomin earned for his labors was dwarfed by the exorbitant royalties picked up by his Italian colleagues invited to work in St. Petersburg. "The Voice of Russia 2003"

Notes

Bibliography
Sokolova, A.: Fomin, the article in "Tvorcheskie portrety kompozitorov", Moskva, Muzyka, 1989, p. 360-362
Abraham, Gerald: The Concise Oxford History of Music, Oxford 1979, p. 479-481
Fomin, Yevstigney Ipat'yevich  by Richard Taruskin, 'The New Grove Dictionary of Opera', ed. Stanley Sadie (London, 1992)

External links
classical archives
classical composers
Russia - 1000 years of music

Classical-period composers
1761 births
1800 deaths
Russian opera composers
Male opera composers
Russian male classical composers
Musicians from Saint Petersburg
18th-century classical composers
18th-century male musicians
18th-century musicians
18th-century musicians from the Russian Empire
Ukrainian people in the Russian Empire